Lichinodium canadense is a species of minute fruticose (bushy) cyanolichen in the family Lichinodiaceae. It is found in British Columbia, Canada, where it grows on conifer bark.

Taxonomy

Lichinodium canadense was formally described as a new species in 1968 by Norwegian lichenologist Aino Henssen. The type specimen was collected in the Fraser River basin along Highway 1; here, in a mixed forest along a riverbank, the lichen was found growing on the bark of western redcedar (Thuja plicata), along with a then-undescribed species of Parmeliella. The specific epithet canadense refers to the country in which it was first found. The species has also been recorded from the Incomappleux River valley in southeastern British Columbia.

Description
The individual lobes comprising the thallus are 0.4–0.8 mm long and 0.04–0.06 mm thick; they are translucent when they are moist. The phycobiont partner is a species of Scytonema, a filamentous cyanobacteria. No apothecia have been recorded, so the lichen is only known to exist in the sterile state.

References

Leotiomycetes
Lichen species
Lichens described in 1968
Lichens of Western Canada
Taxa named by Aino Henssen
Fungi without expected TNC conservation status